Soahany is a town and commune in western Madagascar. It belongs to the district of Antsalova, which is a part of Melaky Region. The population of the commune was estimated to be approximately 10,000 in the 2001 commune census.

Only primary schooling is available. The majority (90%) of the population of the commune are farmers.  The most important crop is rice, while other important products are sugarcane, maize and cassava.  Fishing employs the remaining 10% of the population.

References and notes 

Populated places in Melaky